is a Japanese FM station, an affiliate of the Japan FM Network. Their headquarters are located in Akita Prefecture.

Stations
Akita(Main Station) JOPU-FM 82.8 MHz 3 kW
Hanawa 77.1 MHz 100w
Odate 89.2 MHz 100w
Noshiro 89.7 MHz 100w
Kakunodate 78.9 MHz 3w
Honjo 77.7 MHz 10w
Yuzawa 78 MHz 100w

Programs
Weekly Northern Happinets
Sound Air Cruise (Hisato Charlie Hoizumi)
Lunch Time Step (Hisato Charlie Hoizumi)
Blaublitz on the wave (Shabadabao)

References

Location map

Radio stations in Japan
Radio stations established in 1984
Mass media in Akita (city)